İsmet-Duygu Akşit Oal (born 10 October 1971) is a retired Turkish tennis player.

Akşit Oal won four doubles titles on the ITF circuit in her career. On 9 October 2010, she reached her best singles ranking of world number 580. On 7 July 1997, she peaked at number 357 in the WTA doubles rankings.

Playing for Turkey in Fed Cup, she has a win–loss record of 32–28.

Akşit Oal retirement from professional tennis 2003.

ITF Circuit finals

Singles (0–1)

Doubles (4–2)

References

External links
 
 
 

1971 births
Living people
Sportspeople from Ankara
Turkish female tennis players
Mediterranean Games bronze medalists for Turkey
Competitors at the 1997 Mediterranean Games
Mediterranean Games medalists in tennis
20th-century Turkish sportswomen